The 220s decade ran from January 1, 220, to December 31, 229.

Significant people

References